A Sort of Traitors is a 1949 thriller novel by the British writer Nigel Balchin.

Film adaptation
In 1960 it was made into a film Suspect directed by the Boulting Brothers and starring Tony Britton and Virginia Maskell.

References

Bibliography
 Goble, Alan. The Complete Index to Literary Sources in Film. Walter de Gruyter, 1999.
 James, Clive. At the Pillars of Hercules. Pan Macmillan, 2013.

1949 British novels
Novels by Nigel Balchin
British thriller novels
British novels adapted into films
William Collins, Sons books